William "Billy" Hayes (born April 3, 1947) is an American writer, actor, and film director. He is best known for his autobiographical book Midnight Express about his experiences in and escape from a Turkish prison, after being convicted of smuggling hashish. He was one of hundreds of US citizens in foreign jails serving drug charge sentences, following a drug-smuggling crackdown by foreign governments.

Background
Hayes, an American student, was caught trying to smuggle four pounds (1.81 kg) of hashish out of Turkey on October 7, 1970. He was originally sentenced to four years and two months in a Turkish prison. With his release date weeks away, he learned that the authorities had chosen to penalize him with a life sentence for smuggling, instead of possession.

Hayes was imprisoned at Sağmalcılar prison in Istanbul after having spent one night in Sultanahmet Jail. Following an incident in prison, he was transferred in 1972 to Bakırköy Psychiatric Hospital, described as a 'lunatic asylum'. On several occasions, the United States Department of State pressured Turkey to transfer sentencing to the United States; however, Turkish foreign minister Melih Esenbel stated that the US was not in a position to dispute a sentence issued by a Turkish court. He stated privately to officials that a release might be possible on humanitarian grounds, if Hayes' physical or mental health was deteriorating, but in a private consultation, Hayes stated to US diplomats that his experience at Bakırköy was highly traumatic, and he did not have confidence that the hospital would certify him for early release; Hayes also stated that he felt attempts to win early release would jeopardize his prospects of being transferred to a more desirable half-open prison. On May 12, 1975, the Turkish Constitutional Court declared amnesty for all drug offenses, which shortened Hayes' sentence from life to 30 years; he was transferred to İmralı prison on July 11, 1975.

Declassified telegrams from the State Department indicated that in discussions between the US embassy and Vahap Aşıroğlu, Turkish Director of Consular Affairs, the latter believed Hayes would probably be released from prison on parole in October 1978, which in practice meant that a local prosecutor would declare him persona non grata and expel him from the country. Hayes escaped from İmralı on October 2, 1975, taking a rowboat at night to Bandirma, blending in with locals, and then heading westbound across the border to Greece. After over two weeks of detention and interrogation to determine whether he possessed any useful intelligence about Turkey's military, he was deported from Thessaloniki to Frankfurt on October 20; after interrogation by US authorities in Frankfurt, Hayes spent several days in Amsterdam, and then returned to the United States.

Book
Hayes wrote a book on his experiences, Midnight Express, which was later adapted into the 1978 film of the same name starring Brad Davis as Hayes. The film was directed by Alan Parker, with a screenplay by Oliver Stone. The movie differs from Hayes' account in his book. Among the differences is a scene invented by Stone in which Hayes kills the prison guard Hamidou 'the Bear' (portrayed by Paul L. Smith), the main antagonist of the story. In fact, the prison guard was killed in 1973 by another person entirely, a recently released prisoner, whose family Hamidou had insulted while beating the prisoner; this took place years before Hayes' actual escape.

In 2010, in an episode of National Geographic Channel's Locked Up Abroad, titled "The Real Midnight Express", Hayes finally told his fully accurate version of being sent to the infamous Turkish prison in Sağmalcilar, eventually escaping from İmralı prison on an island in the Marmara Sea. Hayes has since written the sequels Midnight Return (Escaping Midnight Express) and The Midnight Express Letters - from a Turkish Prison, 1970-1975, the latter a collection of the original letters written home to family and friends during his imprisonment.

Acting and writing
Hayes is still active in the entertainment industry, specifically acting and writing. He appeared in the Charles Bronson 1987 film Assassination, as a hired killer.

One of Hayes' successes was writing and directing 2003's Southside (later released in the US as A Cock and Bull Story) which won numerous awards, including the 2002 L.A. Drama Critics' Circle award.

On June 30, 2010, the National Geographic television channel aired Locked Up Abroad: The Real Midnight Express.

Hayes has been traveling the world with his one-man show, Riding the Midnight Express with Billy Hayes, since it premiered at the Edinburgh Fringe Festival in August 2013.

Interview on Midnight Express film
During the 1999 Cannes Film Festival, Alinur Velidedeoğlu, a Turkish advertiser, met Hayes by chance and interviewed him on the film Midnight Express. Hayes expressed his disappointment with parts of the film adaptation, especially its portrayal of all Turks as bad, and his regret that Turkey's image was negatively affected by the film. Hayes also displayed affection for Turkey and the city of Istanbul. Although the Interpol warrant for him had by then been lifted, Hayes explained that while he wanted to return, he hesitated to do so, out of concern that many Turks might blame him for the negative publicity the movie had generated. The video was made available on YouTube. 

The Turkish order banning him from the country was finally suspended and Hayes was allowed to return to Turkey on June 14, 2007, to attend the 2nd Istanbul Conference on Democracy and Global Security, organized by the Turkish National Police (TNP) and the Turkish Institute for Police Studies (TIPS). Hayes said it was important to him to return, in order to "apologize and 'make amends' – not for the book he wrote, but for the movie, scripted by Oliver Stone, on which it was based. 'The film wasn't what Turkish people deserved,' Hayes told reporters at a jammed June 15 press conference, explaining that it painted an unfairly bleak portrait of the country."

See also
List of fugitives from justice who disappeared

References

External links
 
 "Riding the Midnight Express with Billy Hayes" website

1947 births
Living people
20th-century American criminals
American cannabis traffickers
American escapees
American memoirists
American people imprisoned abroad
Cannabis in Turkey
Criminals from New York City
Escapees from Turkish detention
People convicted of cannabis offenses
Turkey–United States relations
Writers from New York City
Marquette University alumni